Lueta is a commune in Harghita County, Romania. It lies in the Székely Land, an ethno-cultural region in eastern Transylvania, and is composed of two villages:

Băile Chirui / Kirulyfürdő
 Lueta / Lövéte

History 

The name of the commune was first recorded in 1332 when its priest was mentioned as "sacerdos de Lueche". In 1567, it was mentioned as Leöwete. The name derives from the ancient form of the Hungarian name Levente worn by several members of the Árpád dynasty.

The villages belonged to Udvarhelyszék district until the administrative reform of Transylvania in 1876, when they fell within the Udvarhely County in the Kingdom of Hungary. In the aftermath of World War I and the Hungarian–Romanian War of 1918–1919, the village passed under Romanian administration; after the Treaty of Trianon of 1920, like the rest of Transylvania, it became part of the Kingdom of Romania. During the interwar period it fell within Odorhei County. In 1940, the Second Vienna Award granted Northern Transylvania to Hungary and the village was held by Hungary until 1944. After Soviet occupation, the Romanian administration returned and the village became officially part of Romania in March 1945. Between 1952 and 1960, the commune fell within the Magyar Autonomous Region, between 1960 and 1968 the Mureș-Magyar Autonomous Region. In 1968, the region was abolished, and since then, the commune has been part of Harghita County.

Demographics
The commune has an absolute Székely (Hungarian) majority. According to the 2011 census it has a population of 3,383; of which 99.76% or 3,375 are Hungarian.

Twinning
The villages are twinned with: 

  Domaszék, Hungary
  Maglód, Hungary
  Budakalász, Hungary

Natives
Márton Balázs (1929–2016)
Albert György

References

Communes in Harghita County
Localities in Transylvania
Székely communities